Russia's Yevgeny Kafelnikov defeated Germany's Tommy Haas in the final, 7–6(7–4), 3–6, 6–2, 4–6, 6–3 to win the gold medal in Men's Singles tennis at the 2000 Summer Olympics. In the bronze-medal match, France's Arnaud Di Pasquale defeated Switzerland's Roger Federer, 7–6(7–5), 6–7(7–9), 6–3. It was Russia's first medal in the event as an independent country (though Russian player Andrei Cherkasov had taken bronze as part of the Unified Team in 1992). France and Germany won their first medals in the event since 1924 and 1912, respectively.

The tournament was played at the Tennis Centre, Sydney Olympic Park, in Sydney, Australia. There were 64 players from 32 nations. Nations were able to enter up to four players each, up from three in prior Games.

The United States' Andre Agassi was the reigning gold medalist from 1996, but he did not participate.

Background

This was the 11th (medal) appearance of the men's singles tennis event. The event has been held at every Summer Olympics where tennis has been on the program: from 1896 to 1924 and then from 1988 to the current program. Demonstration events were held in 1968 and 1984.

The number one seed was Marat Safin of Russia, with Americans Pete Sampras and Andre Agassi (the defending champion) not playing in the Games. Two of the eight quarterfinalists from the 1996 tournament returned: bronze medalist Leander Paes of India and quarterfinal loser Wayne Ferreira of South Africa.

Benin, Belarus, Bolivia, Costa Rica, and Thailand each made their debut in the event. France made its 10th appearance, most among all nations, having missed only the 1904 event.

Competition format

The competition was a single-elimination tournament with a bronze-medal match. Matches before the final were best-of-three sets, with the final being best-of-five sets. The 12-point tie-breaker was used in any set, except the third (or the fifth in the final), that reached 6–6.

Schedule

All times are Australian Eastern Standard Time (UTC+10)

Seeds

Draw

Key 

 INV = Tripartite invitation
 IP = ITF place
 Alt = Alternate
 r = Retired
 w/o = Walkover

Finals

Top half

Section 1

Section 2

Bottom half

Section 3

Section 4

References

Results
ITF Olympic site

Men's singles
Men's events at the 2000 Summer Olympics